The term IMAG is a short form for "image magnification" used in the audiovisual production industry. It refers to large-scale theatrical or concert video projection to enable audience members seated at great distance from the stage to see details of the performer's body language and facial expressions that could not be seen with the unaided eye.

References 

Film_and_video_technology